Ruth Margaret Adler nee Oppenheimer (1 October 1944 – 18 February 1994) was a feminist, human rights campaigner and child welfare advocate. She was founder of Amnesty International's Scotland office as their first employee in Scotland in 1991. She was a founding member of Scottish Women's Aid in 1974, a member of the Lothian Region Children’s Panel and she helped to establish the Scottish Child Law Centre.

Life 
Ruth's parents Charlotte and Rudolf Oppenheimer came  from Germany to Britain as refugees in the 1930s. Ruth was born in Devon, where her father was stationed during the war.

She studied Philosophy, Politics and Economics at Somerville College, Oxford  and an MA in Philosophy at University of London.  She moved to Scotland in the 1960s with her husband and children and became a part-time tutor in the Philosophy Department of Edinburgh University  for many years before gaining a further PhD in Law presenting the thesis 'Rights, interests and reasoning in juvenile justice'''. She was influenced by her superviser Neil MacCormick. Adler was bilingual in English and German and, after obtaining her PhD, she and MacCormick collaborated in translating a number of books by leading Czech (Ota Weinberger) and German (Robert Alexy, Guenter Teubner) legal philosophers from German into English.

While working at The Scottish Child Law Centre she helped to create the first comprehensive database of child law in Scotland. She was a magistrate and a Justice of the Peace. From 1987 to 1991 she was responsible for investigating complaints against solicitors as Assistant to the Lay Observer for Scotland.

As a prominent member of the Edinburgh Jewish community she was editor of the Edinburgh Star. and Secretary  and President (1998) of the Edinburgh Jewish Literary Society.

 Works 
The theme of her thesis (1983) is legal intervention in the lives of children. It was published as a book in 1985 Taking Juvenile Justice Seriously.

 Legacy 
Adler's obituary in The Independent'' describes her three passionate concerns:  'Her life was driven by three passionate concerns: for justice, for children and for her family. To all these she brought a formidable intelligence, unflagging energy, extraordinary determination and, above all, generosity of spirit and loving kindness. These passions were to touch the lives of countless people'.

There is a plaque dedicated to Ruth Adler in the garden of University of Edinburgh Day Nursery.

University of Edinburgh School of Law sponsor an annual Ruth Adler Memorial Lecture on Human Rights. Prominent speakers include Shami Chakrabarti in 2016; Sir Stephen Sedley (2015)  Professor Christopher McCrudden (2013)  Professor Conor Gearty (2009).

The Ruth Adler prize is awarded annually to the best student in the Ordinary course Critical Legal Thinking.

See also
List of peace activists

References 

1944 births
1994 deaths
Alumni of Somerville College, Oxford
Alumni of the University of Edinburgh
British feminists
British women lawyers
Jewish women activists
Women human rights activists
20th-century women lawyers
Scottish justices of the peace
Lawyers from Devon
Jewish British activists
British people of German-Jewish descent
Alumni of the University of London
Amnesty International people
Jewish human rights activists
Jewish feminists